Heads of state throughout the world and at all periods of history may be ranked according to characteristics such as length of time holding that position; age of accession or death; or physical attributes. In this way world records in these characteristics may be identified, although the historical basis for such claims is frequently uncertain.

Longest-reigning/serving

Monarch

Longest-reigning male monarch 

The longest undisputed reigning monarch is Sobhuza II, who ruled the Kingdom of Swaziland under the title of Paramount Chief of Swaziland and later King of Swaziland. He ruled for 82 years and 254 days. However, the longest undisputed reigning ruler of a sovereign state is Louis XIV, who ruled the Kingdom of France for 72 years, 3 months, and 18 days.

Longest-ruling monarch, whose exact dates of rule are unknown is disputed between the following candidates

 Min Hti of Arakan, who ruled the Kingdom of Arakan as an absolute monarch under the title of King of Arakan. He is believed to have ruled for 95 years; however, little documentary evidence exists for this claim.
 Pepi II Neferkare, who ruled the Kingdom of Egypt as an absolute monarch under the title of Pharaoh of Egypt. He is believed to have ruled for either 94 or 64 years.
 Taejodae of Goguryeo, who ruled Goguryeo as an absolute monarch under the title of Taewang ("The Greatest of all Kings"). He is believed to have ruled for either 93 years or 68 years.
 Emperor Nintoku was believed to have ruled Japan as an absolute monarch for 86 years although his chronology is disputed.
 The longest reign of any Non-Disputed Monarch was those of Abd al-Muttalib who was the Lord of Quraysh in present-day Saudi Arabia but he was only a Lord and of a Low Rank.
 Raja Sawai Basavalinga I Rajendra Udaiyer who ruled over as the Raja of Sundem (Portuguese India) for 80 Years between 1763 and 15 May 1843.
Japanese legendary emperors, according to the ancient Japanese calendar, reigned for very long terms of 60–70 years each. The longest ruler of the legendary emperors, Emperor Kōan, was claimed to have reigned for about 101 years. These figures are not included in the list because they are regarded as inaccurate by modern scholars. For those see Longevity Myths.

Longest-reigning female monarch 

The longest reigning female monarch ever was Elizabeth II, who was the Queen of the United Kingdom and other Commonwealth realms, and was a constitutional monarch. She was Queen of the United Kingdom, Australia, Canada, and New Zealand, for 70 years, from 6 February 1952 until her death aged 96 on 8 September 2022.

Longest current reigning male monarch 

The longest current reigning male monarch is Hassanal Bolkiah, who is the Sultan and Yang di-Pertuan of Brunei ("(he) who is Lord"), an absolute monarch of Brunei (which was a British protectorate until independence at the end of 1983). He acceded to the sultanate on 5 October 1967.

The longest current reigning constitutional male monarch is Carl XVI Gustaf, who is the King of Sweden, a sovereign state throughout his reign which began on the 15 September 1973.

Longest current reigning female monarch 

Margrethe II of Denmark is the current longest-reigning female monarch. Her reign began on the 14 January 1972. Currently she is also the only reigning female monarch.

Republic

Longest-serving male president
The longest-serving male president ever was Malietoa Tanumafili II, who held the office of O le Ao o le Malo for a special lifetime term (in derogation from the normal term length of five years), for 45 years and 130 days overall; first alongside Tupua Tamasese Meaʻole from 1962 to 1963 and then as sole head of state from 1963 to 2007. However, despite the office of O le Ao o le Malo being that of a president of a republic, Malietoa Tanumafili II was also one of Samoa's four paramount chiefs.

Longest-serving male non-royal head of state
The longest-serving non-royal head of state in the 20th and 21st centuries was Fidel Castro, who held the titles of Prime Minister of Cuba, First Secretary of the Integrated Revolutionary Organizations, First Secretary of the Central Committee of the United Party for the Socialist Revolution of Cuba, First Secretary of the Central Committee of the Communist Party of Cuba, and President of the Council of State and of the Council of Ministers of the Republic of Cuba. He served overall for 52 years, 2 months, and 3 days but was only head of state from 1976 to 2008 (31 years, 2 months and 22 days).

Longest current serving male president 

The longest-serving and longest current serving male president ever is Teodoro Obiang Nguema Mbasogo, who is currently the President of the Republic of Equatorial Guinea, who seized power in a coup in 1979.

Longest-serving female non-royal head of state and longest serving female 

The longest serving female non-royal head of state and longest serving female president ever was Vigdís Finnbogadóttir, who was the President of the Republic of Iceland. She served for 16 years (5844 days).

Shortest serving
The shortest serving monarch of all time is believed to be Louis XIX of France. After his father's abdication during the July Revolution on August 2, 1830, he ascended to the throne, but abdicated around 20 minutes later. This reign is disputed, as some historians believe this reign is too short to be valid. The next contender is the unnamed daughter of Emperor Xiaoming of Northern Wei who was appointed by her grandmother, Empress Dowager Hu. She reigned for a matter of hours until being replaced by Yuan Zhao.

As part of a coup d'état, Mexican politician Pedro Lascuráin served as the 34th President of Mexico for a short period of time – from 15 to 56 minutes – before he quit in order to make General Victoriano Huerta the next president.

Age

Oldest 
The oldest ruler, whose date of birth is known, is Giovanni Paolo Lascaris. He was Grand Master of the Order of Saint John until his death at the age of 97 years 47 days. The oldest ruler at the time of taking office is Prem Tinsulanonda, who became regent of Thailand at 96 years 97 days old and ruled for several months.

Youngest 
According to legends, the youngest ruler is Shapur II who was crowned in utero when a crown was placed on the belly of Hormizd II's wife after Hormizd II died. However, according to Shapur Shahbazi, it is unlikely. The youngest undisputed ruler are believed to be Alfonso XIII who became King of Spain at birth. The youngest non royal ruler is Jean-Claude Duvalier who became President of Haiti at the age of 19. The youngest female monarch is Mary who became Queen of Scotland at six days old.

Longest lived 
The longest lived undisputed head of state is the President of Turkey Celâl Bayar who lived from 1883 to 1986, and died at 103 years old and 98 days.The oldest undisputed monarch is Jean, Grand Duke of Luxembourg who was Duke of Luxembourg from 1964 until his abdication in 2000, he lived from 5 January 1921 until his death on 23 April 2019 at 98 years, 108 days. The oldest living former head of state is Khamtai Siphandone who was Prime Minister of Laos from 1991 to 1998 and then became President from 1998 to 2006. He is currently . The longest lived female head of state is Khertek Anchimaa-Toka who was Chair of the Presidium of Tuva. She lived from 1 January 1912 to 4 November 2008 dying at 96 years, 308 days. The oldest living female former head of state is Violeta Chamorro who served as President of Nicaragua and was born on 18 October 1929 and is currently  old. The oldest female monarch is Elizabeth II who was  old at the time of her death.

Shortest lived 
The shortest lived head of state is Jean I of France who ruled and lived for five days in 1316.

Ruling houses

Oldest
Officially, the current Emperor of Japan, Naruhito is the 126th in line from the first emperor, Jimmu, who is variously believed to have reigned in the 1st or 7th century BC. The earliest documentary evidence is only for the 29th emperor, Kinmei (AD 509–571); however, this is sufficient such that even the most conservative of estimates still places the Japanese imperial family as among the oldest lines in the world today.

The Ottoman Empire lasted for 36 sultans in 21 generations, from Osman I to Mehmed VI for 623 years. (See List of sultans of the Ottoman Empire.)

Post-nominal numbers
The highest post-nominal number representing a member of a royal house is 75, used by Count Heinrich LXXV Reuss (r. 1800–1801). All male members of the branch were named Heinrich, and were successively numbered from I upwards, from the beginning of each century.

Physical attributes

Heaviest

Tallest

Herodotus wrote in Histories (7:117) that "Xerxes was in stature the tallest of all the Persians, falling short by only four fingers of being five royal cubits in height." A royal cubit is assumed to be a bit more than 20 English inches (52 cm), which makes Xerxes almost 8 feet tall (2.43 m), though this is likely legendary. Sancho VII of Navarre was reported to be .

Shortest

See also 
Head of state
Records of prime ministers of Australia
Records of prime ministers of Hungary
Records of prime ministers of the United Kingdom
List of oldest living state leaders

References 

Head of state